Ping Pong Entertainment, established in 2014, is a Bangladesh-based film production and distribution company. The company specializes in film and television productions. Shukla Banik is the current chairman of the company.

Films produced by Ping Pong Entertainment
Following are the list of notable films produced by Ping Pong Entertainment.

See also
 Tiger Media Limited
 Jaaz Multimedia
 The Abhi Pictures

References

Mass media companies of Bangladesh
Mass media companies established in 2014
Bangladeshi companies established in 2014